The Madrid Spain Temple is the 56th operating temple of the Church of Jesus Christ of Latter-day Saints (LDS Church).

History
The Madrid Spain Temple, built in the Pavones neighborhood of Moratalaz, a district of Madrid, was announced in 1993.

The temple in Madrid is a highly visible symbol of the church's presence in Spain. During the open house, over 100,000 community members and government officials toured the temple, including King Juan Carlos and Queen Sofía.

LDS Church president Gordon B. Hinckley went to Spain to dedicate the Madrid Spain Temple and had his third visit with the King and Queen. During the visit, Hinckley presented them with a special gift created by well-known Spanish artists: a Lladró figurine of the Christus, modeled after the original by Bertel Thorvaldsen. Jose Lladro, president of the Lladro Company, had personally delivered the first five issues of the figurine to Hinckley at the temple site. One of the five figurines is now on permanent display in the temple foyer.

Hinckley dedicated the temple on 19 March 1999.

In 2020, the Madrid Spain Temple was closed in response to the coronavirus pandemic.

See also

 F. Burton Howard, former temple president
 Comparison of temples of The Church of Jesus Christ of Latter-day Saints
 List of temples of The Church of Jesus Christ of Latter-day Saints
 List of temples of The Church of Jesus Christ of Latter-day Saints by geographic region
 Temple architecture (Latter-day Saints)
 The Church of Jesus Christ of Latter-day Saints in Spain

References

Additional reading

External links
 
São Paulo Brazil Temple Official site
São Paulo Brazil Temple at ChurchofJesusChristTemples.org

20th-century Latter Day Saint temples
Buildings and structures in Moratalaz District, Madrid
Religious buildings and structures in Spain
Religious buildings and structures in Madrid
Temples (LDS Church) completed in 1999
Temples (LDS Church) in Europe
The Church of Jesus Christ of Latter-day Saints in Spain
1999 establishments in Spain